Stenothyrsus is a monotypic genus of flowering plants belonging to the family Acanthaceae. The only species is Stenothyrsus ridleyi.

Its native range is Malaysian Peninsula.

References

Acanthaceae
Acanthaceae genera
Monotypic Lamiales genera